Ayesha Kidwai is an Indian theoretical linguist. She is a professor at the Jawaharlal Nehru University in New Delhi, and an awardee of the Infosys Prize for Humanities in 2013.

Biography
She is the grand-daughter of Anis Kidwai. Kidwai obtained a master's and doctoral degree in linguistics from the Jawaharlal Nehru University.

Career

Academic
Kidwai's theoretical linguistics work has applied Noam Chomsky's notion of Universal grammar to South Asian languages. In particular, she studied the parameters that explain the syntactic properties of Meiteilon, Santali, Bengali and Malayalam. She proposed a novel theory on free word order, exemplified by scrambled noun-phrases in Hindi-Urdu.

Kidwai undertook several research projects in field linguistics. Between 1999 and 2001, she investigated the acquisition of the Hindi language among children, and she studied the Urdu's socio-cultural effects on other Indian languages.

In 2008, Kidwai showed that because Sanskrit-speaking ruling classes captured only the public domain, this prestige language was unable to completely cripple less prestigious languages (Indo-Aryan, Dravidian and Austro-Asiatic) that pervaded the subcontinent. Still, the smaller the language, the likelier it was to be dismissed as undeveloped, resulting in its speakers choosing not to take up education in it, fearing that they would be disadvantaged.

Her grandmother, Anis Kidwai's Urdu memoir Azadi ki chhaon mein (In Freedom's Shade), was translated by Kidwai into English in 2011. Anis's husband Shafi had been murdered in Mussoorie in 1947 following the Partition of India, which prompted Anis to become a social activist. Her memoir documents the efforts of the citizenry to stop the cycle of murders and retributions, the activities of the Shanti Dal, an organisation that helped to protect victims of the violence, and the attempts to recover abducted women. Kidwai continued the investigation of the fates of women abducted during the Partition, reporting in 2014 that nearly 80,000 women had been found in the massive recovery operations in the aftermath of the Partition.

Activism
In 1999, Kidwai set up a committee to help orient and sensitise against sexual harassment on the campus of Jawaharlal Nehru University. It was responsible for crisis management as well as mediation, investigation, and redress in response to complaints of sexual harassment. The template was adopted by other universities across India. In 2013, a survey she co-organised with Madhu Sahni revealed that more than half the women in JNU had suffered sexual harassment.

In 2016, Kidwai headed the Jawaharlal Nehru University Teachers' Association (JNUTA). When the student union president Kanhaiya Kumar was arrested on charges of sedition, she joined in the ensuing protests on behalf of the JNUTA.

Selected works

Articles and presentations

Books

References

External links 
 Kidwai's webpage at JNU

Academic staff of Jawaharlal Nehru University
Jawaharlal Nehru University alumni
Living people
Indian women linguists
20th-century Indian linguists
21st-century Indian linguists
21st-century Indian women writers
21st-century Indian writers
20th-century women writers
Year of birth missing (living people)
20th-century Indian women